Spyridium phlebophyllum is a species of flowering plant in the family Rhamnaceae and is endemic to South Australia. It is a low shrub with rigid, egg-shaped leaves, and heads of flowers with a velvety, white floral leaf.

Description
Spyridium phlebophyllum is a low shrub with rigid, egg-shaped leaves, sometimes with the narrower end towards the base. The heads of "flowers" are more or less sessile, usually with a velvety white, floral leaf, the disk deeply divided into 5.

Taxonomy
This species was first formally described in 1855 by Ferdinand von Mueller who gave it the name Trymalium phlebophyllum in his Definitions of rare or hitherto undescribed Australian plants. In 1863, Mueller changed the name to Spyridium phlebophyllum in Fragmenta Phytographiae Australiae.

Distribution
Spyridium phlebophyllum occurs in the Flinders Ranges, Eastern, Eyre Peninsula, Northern Lofty, and Southern Lofty botanical regions of south-eastern South Australia.

References

phlebophyllum
Rosales of Australia
Flora of South Australia
Taxa named by Ferdinand von Mueller
Plants described in 1855